Gê'gyai County (literally "Full Beauty") is a county in Ngari Prefecture of the Tibet Autonomous Region, China.

Gejizhen is a village in Gê'gyai County.

Lake Donggu ( is located in Gê'gyai County.

Demography 
Population of this district was  inhabitants in 1999.

Notes and references 

Counties of Tibet
Ngari Prefecture